Robin Jeffreys (15 December 1890 – 24 November 1963) was a British fencer. He competed in the team sabre event at the 1928 Summer Olympics.

References

1890 births
1963 deaths
British male fencers
Olympic fencers of Great Britain
Fencers at the 1928 Summer Olympics
Sportspeople from the Isle of Wight
20th-century British people